SystemX is a French Institute for Technological Research (IRT) established February 1, 2012, in the framework of the “Investment for the Future” program that was set up to support French Innovation.

A total of 8 IRTs have been created by the government. The only IRT in the Île-de-France region is dedicated to the digital engineering of complex systems. 

The institute includes 100 to 250 researchers, of which 50 were hired by SystemX. The annual budget is € 30M. Legally, it is a Scientific Research Foundation. Its head office is in Nano-Innov with other offices in Inria  and Paris.

Strategy 
SystemX’s functioning lies on two fundamental aspects:
 The Institute gathers all the partners involved in its projects in one location. The idea is to foster synergies between academic and industrial communities;
 Skill and platform pooling: by reaching a critical mass, SystemX plans to create a platform by pooling skills and technological elements.

Management 
 Chief Executive Officer: Paul Labrogère
 Research and Technology Director: Bruno Foyer
 Scientific Director: Patrice Aknin

R&D projects and training 

SystemX focuses on four priority sectors:
 Energy
 Transport and mobility
 Telecommunications
 Security and defense

More precisely, the Institute researches seven themes, each split into two streams:
 Systems of systems: energy management, multimodal transport, security, and multimedia
 Technologies and tools for digital engineering: embedded systems, high-performance computing, cloud computing and networks, simulation and conception tools.

SystemX is interested in academic-industrial relationships concerning the “systems, modelization, complexity” challenges - at the bachelor, master, and Ph.D. levels.

Saclay ecosystem 

Thanks to its location on the Saclay plateau, host to the future Paris-Saclay University, SystemX benefits from Systematic Paris-Region competitiveness cluster and the Paris-Saclay Campus' dynamics – ranked among the world's top 8 world innovation clusters by MIT Technology Review.

History 
 February 21, 2013: SystemX’s official inauguration
 October 31, 2012: Convention signing with ANR (Agence Nationale de la Recherche), the French National Research Agency.
 February 1, 2012: Labelling announcement as part of the “Great Loan” (Grand Emprunt) in the framework of the “Investment for the Future” program).

References

 Les instituts de recherche technologique (IRT), campus d'innovation

External links 
 

Research institutes in France
Paris-Saclay